Lincoln Northeast High School is a public high school in Lincoln, Nebraska, United States. It is part of the Lincoln Public Schools district and was established in 1941 when three rival schools (Bethany, Havelock and Jackson) were combined into one. The school is accredited by the North Central Association of Colleges and Secondary Schools and has been rated "AA" by the Nebraska Department of Education since 1943.

Mascot 
The school's athletic teams are known as the Rockets.  The name was originally taken from the Rock Island Rocket, a passenger train that once passed through northeast Lincoln.  In the 1960s, a decommissioned Nike Ajax missile was donated to the school and placed on the front lawn.  The missile was repeatedly stolen and recovered; in 1990, it disappeared permanently.  In 2016, members of the booster club raised $55,000 for a new ,  rocket sculpture.

Athletics 
Lincoln Northeast teams have won state championships in the following years:
 Baseball - 1957
 Boys' basketball - 1949, 1950, 1962, 1967, 1968, 1970, 1973, 1982, 1995, 1996, 1997, 1998 
 Girls' basketball - 2005
 Bowling - 2003, 2004, 2006
 Cross country - 1971
 Football - 1943, 1950, 1962, 1972 (tie)
 Gymnastics - 1957, 1958, 1962, 1963, 1965, 1966, 1967
 Boys' golf - 1965
 Volleyball - 1981, 1984, 1991, 1998.

Notable alumni 
 William L. Armstrong, U.S. Representative and Senator from Colorado
 Shawn Bouwens, professional football player for Detroit Lions and Jacksonville Jaguars
 Joba Chamberlain, professional baseball player, pitcher for Detroit Tigers and New York Yankees
 Gene V. Glass, statistician who coined term "meta-analysis"
 Trevor Johnson, professional football player for New York Jets
 Joseph Robert "Bob" Kerrey, Medal of Honor recipient; President of The New School in New York City; Governor of Nebraska; U.S. Senator from Nebraska; 1992 Democratic Presidential candidate
 Peggy Liddick, Australian women's national gymnastics coach
 Mike Lux, co-founder and president of Progressive Strategies, L.L.C.
 Danny Noonan, professional football player for Dallas Cowboys and Green Bay Packers
 Erwin Swiney, professional football player for Green Bay Packers.

References 

 

Public high schools in Nebraska
Schools in Lincoln, Nebraska
Educational institutions established in 1941
1941 establishments in Nebraska